Sir Walter Besant (14 August 1836 – 9 June 1901) was an English novelist and historian. William Henry Besant was his brother, and another brother, Frank, was the husband of Annie Besant.

Early life and education
The son of wine merchant William Besant (1800–1879), he was born at Portsmouth, Hampshire and attended school at St Paul's, Southsea, Stockwell Grammar, London and King's College London. In 1855, he was admitted as a pensioner to Christ's College, Cambridge, where he graduated in 1859 as 18th wrangler. 

After a year as Mathematical Master at Rossall School, Fleetwood, Lancashire, and a year at Leamington College, he spent six years as professor of mathematics at the Royal College, British Mauritius. A decline in health compelled him to resign, and he returned to England and settled in London in 1867. From 1868 to 1885, he held the position of Secretary to the Palestine Exploration Fund. In 1871, he was admitted to Lincoln's Inn.

In 1874, Besant married Mary Garrett ( Foster Barham), daughter of Eustace Foster-Barham, of Bridgwater, with whom he had four children. For some time he took care of his sister-in-law Annie Besant, a prominent women’s rights activist, socialist, and theosophist.

Career
In 1868 he published Studies in French Poetry. Three years later he began his collaboration with writer James Rice. Among their joint productions are Ready-money Mortiboy (1872), and The Golden Butterfly (1876), both, especially the latter, very successful. This association was ended by the death of Rice in 1882. 

Thereafter, Besant continued to write voluminously by himself, his main novels being All in a Garden Fair (which Rudyard Kipling credited in Something of Myself with inspiring him to leave India and make a career as a writer, and which George Gissing read with 'extreme delight', calling it 'one of the most charming and delicate of modern novels), Dorothy Forster (his own favorite), Children of Gibeon, and All Sorts and Conditions of Men. The two last belonged to a series in which he endeavored to arouse the public conscience to the hardship among the poorest classes of cities. In this crusade Besant had considerable success, the establishment of The People's Palace in the East of London being one result. His 1889 novel The Bell of St. Paul's was considered by his contemporary author George Gissing to be an 'absurd and empty book'. 

In addition to his fiction, Besant wrote largely on the history and topography of London. His plans for this topic were left unfinished: among his books on this subject is London in the 18th Century.

Besant was a freemason, joining the Lodge of Harmony in Mauritius in 1862. He became Master of Marquis of Dalhousie Lodge, London in 1873, having joined in 1869. He was one of the founders of the first Masonic research lodge, Quatuor Coronati Lodge No 2076, of which he was the first treasurer from 1886. He was also one of the founders and first chair of the Society of Authors in 1884. He was knighted in the 1895 Birthday Honours.

He was treasurer of the "Atlantic Union", an association which sought to improve social relations between Britons and Americans. He died in Frognal in London on 9 June 1901, aged 64.

Works

Fiction
The Alabaster Box. 1900.
Alfred. 3rd ed. 1899.
All in a Garden Fair. 3 vols. 1883.  
All Sorts and Conditions of Men. 3 vols. 1882.  
Armorel of Lyonesse. 3 vols. 1890.  
The Bell of St. Paul's. 3 vols. 1889.
Beyond the Dreams of Avarice. 1895.
Blind Love. By Wilkie Collins, completed and with preface by W. Besant. 3 vols. 1890.
By Celia’s Arbour: A tale of Portsmouth town. With James Rice. Reprinted from The Graphic. 3 vols. 1878.
The Captains' Room etc.. 3 vols.
The Case of Mr. Lucraft and other tales. By the authors of Ready Money Mortiboy (with James Rice). 2 vols. 1876.
The Changeling. 1898.
The Chaplain of the Fleet. With James Rice 3 vols. 1881.  
Children of Gibeon. 2nd ed. 3 vols. 1886.
The City of Refuge. 3 vols. 1896.   
Dorothy Forster. 3 vols. 1884.  
Doubts of Dives. [Speculative fiction in which a rich and poor man exchange bodies].
A Five Years' Tryst and other stories. 1902.
For Britain's Soldiers. By W.L. Alden, Sir W. Besant etc., with preface by C.J.C. Hyne. 1900.
For Faith and Freedom. 3 vols. 1889.  
The History of London, 1894.
A Fountain Sealed. 1897.
The Fourth Generation. 1900.
The Golden Butterfly. With James Rice. 3 vols. 1876.  
Herr Paulus. 3 vols. 1888.  
The Holy Rose &c. 1890.
In Deacon's Orders &c. 1895.
 The Inner House. 1888. [Dystopian fiction about a society that has discovered immortality]
The Ivory Gate. 3 vols. 1893.  
The Lady of Lynn. 1901.
The Master Craftsman. 2 vols. 1896.
The Monks of Thelema. With James Rice. 3 vols. 1878.  
My Little Girl. By the authors of Ready-money Mortiboy. With James Rice.  3 vols.  1873.
No Other Way. 1902.
The Orange Girl. 1899.
Ready-Money Mortiboy. Repr. from Once a Week.  With James Rice. 3 vols. 1872.  Repr. of 1885 ed. Bath, 1974. 
The Rebel Queen. 3 vols. 1893.
The Revolt of Man. 1882. [Speculative fiction: traditional roles of sexes are reversed].
St. Katherine's by the Tower. 3 vols. 1891.
The Seamy Side. With James Rice. 3 vols. 2nd. ed. 1880.  
The Ten Years' Tenant and other stories. With James Rice. 3 vols.
This Son of Vulcan. By the authors of Ready-Money Mortiboy. With James Rice. 3 vols. 1876.
To Call Her Mine &c. 1889.
"Twas in Trafalgar's Bay" and other stories. With James Rice. 2nd ed. 1879.
Uncle Jack &c. 1885.  
Verbena, Camellia, Stephanotis, &c. 1892.
With Harp and Crown. By the authors of “Ready-Money Mortiboy.” With James Rice. 3 vols. 1875.  
The World Went Very Well Then. 3 vols (vol. I, vol. II, vol. III). 1887.

Collected editions (fiction)

Novels by W.B. and James Rice. Library ed. 10 vols. 1887–88. Comprising in sequence Ready-Money Mortiboy, This Son of Vulcan, With Harp and Crown, The Golden Butterfly, By Celia’s Arbour, The Seamy Side, The Chaplain of the Fleet, The Case of Mr. Lucraft and Other Tales, ‘Twas in Trafalgar’s Bay and Other Stories, The Ten Years’ Tenant and Other Stories [My Little Girl, The Monks of Thelema apparently missing from this series].

Plays
The Charm and other drawing-room plays. With W. Pollock. 1896

General non-fiction 
[excluding items on London]
"The Amusements of the People", Contemporary Review 45 (1884): 342-53.
William Tuckwell, Art and hand work for the people, being three papers read before the Social Science Congress, Sept. 1884. By W.T., C. G. Leland, and W. Besant. Manchester, 1885.
The Art of Fiction: A Lecture Delivered at the Royal Institution on Friday Evening, April 25, 1884.  1884. New ed., 1902.
As we are and as we may be. 1903.
Autobiography. With prefatory note by S. Squire Sprigge. Hutchinson, 1902.
Bourbon journal, August 1863. 1933.Captain Cook. English Men of Action. 1890.Constantinople. A sketch of its history from its foundation to its conquest by the Turks in 1453. By W.J.B. and Walter Besant. 1879.Essays and Historiettes. 1903.The Eulogy of Richard Jefferies. 1888.Fifty Years Ago. 1888.The French Humourists from the 12th to the 19th century. 1873.Gaspard de Coligny. The New Plutarch. 1879. New ed. 1894.Jerusalem, the City of Herod and Saladin. By W.B. and E.H. Palmer. 1871.The Life and Achievements of Edward Henry Palmer. 1883.The Pen and the Book. 1899.The Queen’s Reign and its commemoration. 1897.Sir Richard Whittington, Lord Mayor of London. With James Rice. The New Plutarch. 1881. New ed. 1894.The Story of King Alfred. [1912].Studies in Early French Poetry. 1868.Rabelais. 1879.

Selected Books on London 
[volumes in the 10-volume Survey of London published by A & C. Black are included under their individual volume titles and marked with an asterisk]
"The People's Palace", Contemporary Review 51 (1887): 226-33.East London. 1901.Early London: prehistoric, Roman, Saxon, and Norman. 1908.*Hackney and Stoke Newington. With G. E. Mitton. Fascination of London series. 1908.Holborn and Bloomsbury. With G. E. Mitton. Fascination of London series. 1903.London. 1892.London. 1894.London. City. 1910.*London in the Eighteenth Century. 1902.*London in the Nineteenth Century. 1909.*=London in the Time of the Stuarts. 1903.*=London in the Time of the Tudors. 1904.*London, North of the Thames. 1911.*London, South of the Thames. 1912.*Medieval London. 2 vols. 1906.**Shoreditch and the East End. With others. Fascination of London series. 1908.South London. 1899.The Strand District. With G. E. Mitton. Fascination of London series. Repr. with corrections. 1903.The Thames. Fascination of London series. 1903.Westminster. 1895.

Memorial
There is a monument to Besant in the crypt at St Paul's Cathedral.
References and Citations

Further reading
S. T. Bindoff, "East End Delight", East London Papers 3 (1960): 31–40.
Fred W. Boege, "Sir Walter Besant: Novelist", Nineteenth Century Fiction 10 (1956): 249–80; 11 (1956): 32–60.
Simon Eliot, "'His Generation Read His Stories': Walter Besant, Chatto and Windus and All Sorts and Conditions of Men," Publishing History 21 (1987): 25–67.
John Goode, "The Art of Fiction: Walter Besant and Henry James," in David Howard, John Lucas, and John Goode, eds., Tradition and Tolerance in Nineteenth-Century Fiction: Critical Essays on Some English and American Novels (London: Routledge and Kegan Paul, 1966).
Charles G. Harper, "Walter Besant’s London", Chapter VII of his A Literary Man’s London (London: Cecil Palmer, 1926), pp. 196–221.
Gareth Stedman Jones, Outcast London: A Study in the Relationship between Classes in Victorian Society (Oxford: Clarendon, 1971).
P. J. Keating, The Working Classes in Victorian Fiction (London: Routledge and Kegan Paul, 1971).
Peter Keating, The Haunted Study: A Social History of the English Novel 1875–1914 (London: Secker and Warburg, 1989).
Andrew Mearns, "The Bitter Cry of Outcast London" (1883 penny pamphlet).
G. P. Moss and M. V. Saville, From Palace to College: An Illustrated Account of Queen Mary College, University of London (London: Queen Mary College, 1985).
Wim Neetens, "Problems of a 'Democratic Text': Walter Besant’s Impossible Story," Novel 23 (1990): 247-64.
Alan Palmer, The East End: Four Centuries of London Life (London: John Murray, 1989).
Review, All Sorts and Conditions of Men, Westminster Review NS 63 (January 1883): 288.
Review, All Sorts and Conditions of Men, Spectator, 21 October 1882: 1349.
Helen Small, "Introduction," Walter Besant, All Sorts and Conditions of Men (Oxford: OUP, 1997), x-xxv.
Mark Spilka, "Henry James and Walter Besant: 'The Art of Fiction' Controversy," Novel 6 (1973): 101-9.
Eileen Yeo, "Culture and Constraint in Working-Class Movements," in Eileen Yeo and Stephen Yeo, eds., Popular Culture and Class Conflict, 1590–1914: Explorations in the History of Labour and Leisure'' (Brighton, 1987), 155-86.

External links

 London History Collection at University College London (includes circa 40 works by Besant)
 Sir Walter Besant Collection at the Harry Ransom Center
 
 
 

1836 births
1901 deaths
Writers from Portsmouth
Alumni of King's College London
Fellows of King's College London
Alumni of Christ's College, Cambridge
Burials at St John-at-Hampstead
English male novelists
Knights Bachelor
19th-century English novelists
19th-century male writers
Victorian novelists